Kelakhera is a Municipality Town (Nagar Panchayat) in Tehsil Bajpur of Udham Singh Nagar district in the Indian state of Uttarakhand.

Geography

Demographics
As of the 2011 India census, Kelakhera had a population of 14911. Males constituted 53% of the population, and females 47%. Kelakhera has an average literacy rate of 54%, lower than the national average of 59.5%: male literacy is 60%, and female literacy 34%.

Education 

 Jamia Alvia Islahul Qaum, Islamiya College (http://www.jamiaalvia.in)
 Madarsa Aaliya Shahbaz ul Uloom, Arbi Inter College (http://www.madarsaaaliya.in)
 Jamia Al Hidayat ul Islam, Girls Inter College (http://www.jamiahidaya.in)
 Govt. Inter College
 Govt. Primary School
 Madarsa Ghareeb Nawaz, Arbi Inter College

Hospitality 

 Govt. Basic Community Hospital

Social Organizations 

 All India Ali Welfare Educational Society (http://www.awesindia.org)
 Hussaini Educational & Mahila Gram Vikas Samiti
 Press Club Kelakhera

Religious Organizations 

 Khanqah e Aaliya Taifooriya Madariya Shahbaziya Owaisiya (http://www.shahbazemillat.in)
 Anjuman Islamiya Committee
 Shri Ram leela Committee
 Gurudwara Singh Sabha Committee

Religious Places 

 Jama Masjid Kelakhera
 Dargah Hazrat Bhullan Shah Miyan Rh. at Beria Road Malkandpur.
 Imam Bargah Khanqah e Aaliya Shahbaziya Owaisiya
 Karbala Field
 Dargah Hazrat Dada Miyan Rh. 
 Gurudwara
 Shiv Mandir

Events 

 Official Weekly off : Sunday
 Weekly Haat Bazaar : Friday & Tuesday

Climate 

Source : https://tcktcktck.org

Rivers 

 Bor River
 Gaini River
 Gadri River

Connectivity 

 NH-74 (New NH-309) Main Highway
 Suar (Rampur) Link Road
 Bazpur-BZP, Kashipur-KPV & Rudrapur City-RUPC (Nearest Railway Stations)
 Pantnagar (Nearest Airport)

Nearest Cities 

 Bazpur Block / Tehsil / Sub Divisional Headquarter
 Gadarpur
 Rudrapur
 Kashipur
 Suar
 Haldwani
 Nainital
 Moradabad

References

Cities and towns in Udham Singh Nagar district